Michael John Abbensetts (8 June 1938 – 24 November 2016) was a Guyana-born British writer who settled in England in the 1960s. He had been described as "the best Black playwright to emerge from his generation, and as having given "Caribbeans a real voice in Britain". He was the first black British playwright commissioned to write a television drama series, Empire Road, which the BBC aired from 1978 to 1979.

Early years

Born in Georgetown, British Guiana (now Guyana), the son of Neville John (a doctor) and Elaine Abbensetts, Michael Abbensetts attended Queen's College from 1952 to 1956, then Stanstead College, Quebec, Canada, and Sir George Williams University, in Montreal (1960–61), before moving to England "around 1963". He became a British citizen in 1974.

Writing career
Abbensetts's work debuted in theatre in 1973 with Sweet Talk, which had a cast including Mona Hammond and Don Warrington. It was directed by Stephen Frears. For television, Abbensetts's 1977 work Black Christmas aired on BBC and was 
also directed by Frears. It has been called by Stephen Bourne "one of the best television dramas of the 1970s". From the 1970s to 1990s, Abbensetts continued his theatre career throughout London. Some of his works during this time period included Samba (1980), Outlaw (1983), and The Lion (1993). 

Apart from plays, Abbensetts was a screenwriter for Empire Road (BBC, 1978–79), considered British television's first Black soap opera. He has said: "I never really liked it being called a Soap. It was The Daily Mail that called it that. I always thought of it as a drama series, where each episode had a separate story." The second series was directed by Horace Ové, "establishing a production unit with a Black director, Black writer and Black actors." The cast featured Norman Beaton, Corinne Skinner-Carter, Joseph Marcell, Rudolph Walker and Wayne Laryea. Other television projects by Abbensetts include Easy Money (1981), Big George Is Dead (Channel 4, 1987), starring Norman Beaton, Linzi Drew and Ram John Holder, and the mini-series Little Napoleons (1994, Channel 4).

Teaching and fellowships

In 1983–84, Abbensetts was Visiting Professor of Drama at Carnegie-Mellon University. From September 2002, he was a Project Fellow in the Caribbean Studies Department of the University of North London. He was a Fellow at City and Guilds of London Art School, 2006–09.

Later years and personal life

With Abbensetts' health declining in his latter years as a result of Alzheimer's disease, a tribute was organised for his benefit by Anton Phillips on Sunday, 9 December 2012: a rehearsed reading of Sweet Talk, directed by Phillips and attended by Abbensetts himself, was held at the Tricycle Theatre, with many well known figures in Black theatre and arts in the audience, including Yvonne Brewster, Don Warrington, Rudolph Walker, Oscar James, Allister Bain, and Errol Lloyd.

Abbensetts died aged 78 on 24 November 2016, survived by his daughter, Justine, from his relationship with Anne Stewart, and by two grandchildren, Sean and Danielle, as well as a sister Elizabeth. His first wife Connie, a lawyer, had died of cancer towards the end of the 1980s, and in 2005 he was married to Liz Bluett, though they later separated.

Selected works

Stage plays
 Sweet Talk (two acts), produced at the Theatre at New End, 1973.
 Alterations, produced at the New End Theatre, 1978.
 Samba (two acts), produced at the Tricycle Theatre, 1980.
 In the Mood (two acts), produced at the Hampstead Theatre, 1981.
 The Outlaw, produced at the Arts Theatre, 1983.
 El Dorado, produced at the Theatre Royal Stratford East, 1984.
 The Lion, produced at the Cochrane Theatre, 1993.

Television plays
 The Museum Attendant, BBC2, 1973
 Inner City Blues, 1974; 
 Crime and Passion, 1975; 
 Roadrunner, 1977; 
 Black Christmas, BBC, 1977. 
 Empire Road, series, BBC, 1978–79.
 Big George Is Dead, Channel 4, 1987.
 Little Napoleons, mini-series, Channel 4, 1994.

Radio plays
 Sweet Talk, BBC Radio, 1974.
 Home Again, BBC Radio, 1975.
 The Sunny Side of the Street, BBC Radio, 1977.
 Brothers of the Sword, BBC Radio, 1978.
 Alterations, BBC World Service, 1980.
 The Fast Lane, Capital Radio, 1980.
 The Dark Horse, BBC Radio, 1981.

Bibliography
 Sweet Talk, London: Methuen, 1974.
 Empire Road (novelisation of TV series), London: Grenada, 1979.
 Four Plays (Sweet Talk; Alterations; In the Mood; El Dorado), London: Oberon Books, 2001.

References 

 Leavy, Suzan. "Abbensetts an Example". Television Today (London, England), 19 May 1994.
 Walters, Margaret. "Taking Race for Granted". New Society (London, England), 16 November 1978.

External links 

 

 
 Michael Abbensetts profile at Royal Literary Fund.

1938 births
2016 deaths
Guyanese dramatists and playwrights
Alumni of Queen's College, Guyana
Guyanese emigrants to England
Sir George Williams University alumni
Academics of the University of North London
People from Georgetown, Guyana
Black British writers
20th-century British dramatists and playwrights
British male dramatists and playwrights
20th-century British male writers
20th-century British writers
20th-century Guyanese writers